Wallaroo is a rural locality in New South Wales close to the Australian Capital Territory.
It lies north of the Australian Capital Territory border, north west of Hall, west of the Barton Highway, and east of the Murrumbidgee River. It is approximately 19 kilometres north-west of the Australian city of Canberra.

The cadastral unit in the area is known as Wallaroo Parish. Between 1981–1990, the Serbian Orthodox Church constructed the St. Sava monastery at Wallaroo. Established as the headquarters of the Serbian Orthodox Eparchy of Australia and New Zealand, the church is modeled on the Kalenić monastery in Serbia, built in the 15th century.

Namesakes 
There is also a Wallaroo Parish, near Dubbo in Lincoln County, New South Wales that is not near this locality (approximately 350 kilometres away).

There is also a Wallaroo in South Australia.

References

External links 

Localities in New South Wales
Yass Valley Council